Besozzi is the surname of an ancient and noble family of Western Insubria still present in Lombardy and Ticino, with dozens of family branches. The name originates from the town of Besozzo, home to their castle. 

 Ambrogio Besozzi (1648-1706), Italian painter 
 Branchino Besozzi (1381-1399), bishop of Bergamo 
 Gioacchino Besozzi, (1679-1755) Italian cardinal 
 Guillermo Besozzi (1961), Uruguayan politician, entrepreneur and former polo player 
 Nino Besozzi (1901-1971), Italian actor
 Tommaso Besozzi (1903–1964), Italian journalist and writer 

Members of the large Besozzi family of musicians are: 

 Alessandro Besozzi (1702-1773), Italian oboist and composer 
 Antonio Besozzi (1714-1781), Italian oboist and composer 
 Carlo Besozzi (1738-1791), Italian oboist and composer
 Cristoforo Besozzi (1661-1725), Italian oboist and bassoonist
 Francesco Besozzi (1766-1816), Italian oboist
 Gaetano Besozzi (1725-1798), Italian oboist and composer 
 Girolamo Besozzi (1745 or 1750-1788), Italian oboist and composer 
 Giuseppe Besozzi (1686-1760), Italian oboist 
 Henri Besozzi (1775-?), Italian flutist
 Louis Désiré Besozzi (1814-1879), French oboist and composer 
 Paolo Girolamo Besozzi (1713-1778), Italian bassoonist, oboist and composer

Surnames of Italian origin
Italian-language surnames